John Edwin Rogerson (8 January 1865 – 23 March 1925) was a Conservative Party politician in the United Kingdom.

He was appointed a deputy lieutenant of County Durham in 1905.

He contested the 1918 general election in the Labour-held Barnard Castle constituency in County Durham. He stood as a Coalition Conservative, but in a three-way contest his "coalition coupon" was insufficient to take the seat from the Labour Party candidate John Swan. Rogerson stood again at the 1922 election, when he was helped by the absence of a Liberal Party candidate, and gained the seat with a narrow majority over Swan.

Rogerson's tenure as Member of Parliament (MP) for Barnard Castle was short-lived. At the 1923 election, Moss Turner-Samuels retook the seat for Labour with a majority of over 10%. After his defeat, Rogerson did not stand for Parliament again. He died in 1925, aged 60.

References

External links 
 

1865 births
1925 deaths
Conservative Party (UK) MPs for English constituencies
Deputy Lieutenants of Durham
UK MPs 1922–1923